Under international law, a refugee is a person who has fled their own country of nationality or habitual residence, and cannot return due to fear of persecution on account of their race, religion, nationality, membership in a particular social group, or political opinion. These recent migration movements are caused by a variety of reasons. Some refugees stay in refugee camps, some are urban refugees in individual accommodations, some stay in self-settled camps, and the location of some refugees is undefined or unknown by UNHCR.

By destination country of asylum 

The below table is based on UNHCR data and does not include data for people of concern to the UNRWA or those not known to the UNHCR. These people have fled their country/territory of origin and registered with the UNHCR in these countries or territories.

By country of origin

The below table is based on UNHCR data and does not include data for people of concern to the UNRWA or those not known to the UNHCR. These people registered with the UNHCR outside of their country of origin.

See also 

 List of largest refugee crises

References

External links
UNHCR Statistical Yearbooks

Refugee population